The Pratt & Whitney Canada PW300 series is a family of turbofan jet engines developed by Pratt & Whitney Canada specifically for business jet applications.

Design and development
The PW 300 series has been developed in partnership with MTU who are responsible for the low pressure turbine.

The first variant, the PW305A, has the following configuration and was designed with a core flexible enough for engines with take-off thrusts from 4,500 to 7,000 lb : a single-stage fan driven by a three-stage low pressure turbine, supercharging a four-stage axial/single-stage centrifugal high-pressure compressor, driven by a two-stage high-pressure turbine. An annular combustor is used. There is no forced mixing before the bypass and core streams leave the engine through a common nozzle. The engine is controlled with a dual channel Full Authority Digital Engine Control (FADEC) system. 

The PW307A is a new centre-line engine developed specifically for a tri-jet application on the Dassault Falcon 7X. The PW307 was certified by Transport Canada in March 2005.

The PW308A has been chosen to power the Scaled Composites White Knight Two, the launch aircraft for Virgin Galactic's SpaceShipTwo.

Unscheduled interventions went from 85% in 2015 to 20% in 2017, driving up the PW307 availability thanks to Pratt's digital platform, and engine dispatch reliability is at 99.4% for the Falcon 7X/8X powered by the PW307.

Variants

PW305A
 variant used on the Bombardier Learjet 60.
PW305B
 variant used on the Hawker 1000.
PW306A
 variant used on the IAI Galaxy & Gulfstream G200.
PW306B
Variant used on the Dornier 328JET.
PW306C
 variant used on the Cessna Citation Sovereign.
PW306D
 variant used on the Cessna Citation Sovereign +.
PW306D1
 variant used on the Cessna Citation Latitude.
PW307A
 variant used on the Dassault Falcon 7X. Originally  growth version of the PW306, smaller than the PW308, featuring swept-blade fan, increased core airflow, low NOx emissions combustor, increased turbine capacity and a more efficient exhaust mixer; integrated propulsion system including Macchi/Hurel Dubois nacelle and thrust-reverser; certification scheduled for the end of 2004.
PW307BVariant used on the Bombardier Learjet 85.
PW307DVariant used on the Dassault Falcon 8X.
PW308A
 variant used on the Hawker 4000 & Scaled Composites White Knight Two.
PW308C
 variant used on the Dassault Falcon 2000EX/DX/LX.

Applications
 Cessna Citation Latitude
 Cessna Citation Sovereign
 Dassault Falcon 2000EX/DX/LX
 Dassault Falcon 7X
 Fairchild Dornier 328JET
 Fairchild Dornier 428JET
 Gulfstream G200
 Hawker 1000
 Hawker 4000
 Learjet 60
 Learjet 85
 Scaled Composites White Knight Two

Specifications (PW306B)

See also

References

External links

 Pratt & Whitney Canada PW300 page

High-bypass turbofan engines
Mixed-compressor gas turbines
Pratt & Whitney Canada aircraft engines